Dharmottara (Tibetan: chos mchog) was an 8th-century Buddhist author of several important works on pramana (valid cognition, epistemology), including commentaries on the writings of Dharmakirti. Only one of his works survives in the original Sanskrit, the Nyāyabinduṭīkā, while others survive in Tibetan translation.

Works
Apoha-nāma-prakaraṇa (gzhan sel ba zhes bya ba'i rab tu byed pa)
Kṣaṇabhaṅgasiddhi (skad cig ma 'jig pa grub pa)
Nyāyabinduṭīkā (rigs pa'i thigs pa'i rgya cher 'grel pa)
Paralokasiddhi ('jig rten pha rol grub pa)
Pramāṇaparīkṣā (tshad ma brtag pa)
Pramāṇaviniścayaṭīkā (tshad ma rnam par nges pa'i 'grel bshad)

See also
 Buddhist logic
 Epistemology

References

Buddhist writers
Indian scholars of Buddhism
8th-century Indian philosophers
Indian logicians
Buddhist logic
Year of birth uncertain
8th-century Indian mathematicians